Jorge Maqueda Peño  (born 15 March 1988) is a Spanish handball player for HBC Nantes  and the Spanish national team.

He competed for Spain in the 2012 Summer Olympics.

Honours and awards

Vardar Skopje
 EHF Champions League Winner: 2016–17
 Macedonian Handball Super League: 2015–16, 2016–17, 2017–18
 Macedonian Handball Cup: 2016, 2017, 2018

MOL-Pick Szeged
 Magyar Kézilabdakupa: 2018–2019

Individual
 SEHA League All-Star Team Best Right Back: 2019–20

References

External links

1988 births
Living people
Sportspeople from Toledo, Spain
Spanish male handball players
Liga ASOBAL players
FC Barcelona Handbol players
RK Vardar players
BM Aragón players
SC Pick Szeged players
Veszprém KC players
Handball players at the 2012 Summer Olympics
Expatriate handball players
Spanish expatriate sportspeople in France
Olympic handball players of Spain
Spanish expatriate sportspeople in Hungary
Spanish expatriate sportspeople in North Macedonia
Handball players at the 2020 Summer Olympics
Medalists at the 2020 Summer Olympics
Olympic bronze medalists for Spain
Olympic medalists in handball
21st-century Spanish people